The prime minister of Saudi Arabia is the chair of the Council of Ministers and head of government of the Kingdom of Saudi Arabia. Mohammed bin Salman has been Prime Minister since 27 September 2022. The post has always been held by either the King or the Crown Prince.

History

The office was created along with the Council of Ministers on 9 October 1953, by decree of King Saud. Due to unrest within the royal family over his rule, Saud was forced to appoint his half-brother, Crown Prince Faisal, as prime minister. An ongoing power struggle between the two led to Faisal's resignation in 1960, allowing Saud to reclaim the reins of government, but continued discontent saw Faisal return as prime minister in 1962. After the deposition of Saud in 1964, Faisal succeeded him as king, while remaining prime minister. Since the reign of King Khalid, others have done much of the "heavy lifting" as the king was either unwilling or unable to carry the workload, especially as the kingdom became a gerontocracy during the 1990s and 2000s. The current one is the King's son Mohammad, who is his father's top aide.

List of Prime Ministers of Saudi Arabia

See also
List of kings of Saudi Arabia

References